The Nogoa River is a river located in Central Queensland, Australia.

Course and features
The river rises on the Carnarvon Range, part of the Great Dividing Range, in the Carnarvon National Park and flows in a generally north easterly direction towards . From source to mouth, the Nogoa River is joined by 29 minor tributaries. North of  the river forms confluence with the Comet River to form the Mackenzie River. The Nogoa descends  over its  course. The river is crossed by the Gregory and Capricorn Highways at Emerald.

The river has a catchment area of  draining parts of the Minerva Hills, Peak Range, Snake Range national parks. Of this area,  is riverine wetlands.

The reservoir created by Queensland's second largest dam, Lake Maraboon was formed when the Fairbairn Dam was built on the river in 1972. The dam and a network of channels along the Nogoa River supplies water for the Emerald Irrigation Area.

Sir Thomas Mitchell was the first European explorer to discover the river on 19 July 1846.

Major flooding events
In January 2008, the Nogoa River reached record flood levels. During the flood, water levels in the Fairbairn Dam rapidly exceeded 100%. Within a week inundations had caused severe disruptions to graziers, crops growers and to residents of Emerald when waters broke its banks. The unprecedented floods washed through the Ensham coal mine, temporarily halting operations in two out of six coal pits, reducing output to less than 50% and rendering a huge dragline defunct after it had been submerged.

In December 2010 - January 2011 the river was impacted by major flooding at Emerald and in the Nogoa's upper catchment.

Cultural Heritage 
The traditional owners include the Gayiri people who occupied the area for tens of thousands of years before European colonisation began in the nineteenth century. The Gayiri (Kairi, Khararya) language region takes in the landscape of the Central Highlands Regional Council, including Emerald and Nogoa River.

See also

References

Rivers of Queensland
Floods in Queensland
Central Queensland